The Karto-Zan languages, also known as Georgian-Zan, are a branch of the Kartvelian language family that contains the Georgian and Zan languages. The Svan language forms the other branch of the Kartvelian family, showing characteristic differences from the Karto-Zan group. It has been hypothesized that the divergence between Svan and Proto-Kartvelian goes back as far as the 19th century BCE. Georgian and Zan on the other hand diversified from Proto-Georgian-Zan during the 7th century BCE. Both languages share common archaic words related to metallurgy and agriculture absent in Svan.

Classification 

The Karto-Zan languages constitute a branch of the Kartvelian language family. Glottolog internally divides the Karto-Zan group into the Georgic languages, which contain Georgian and its dialects, Judaeo-Georgian and Old Georgian, and the Zan languages, which contain the Mingrelian and Laz languages.

References 

Kartvelian languages
Agglutinative languages
Georgian-Zan languages